Colombian–Mexican relations are the historical and current bilateral relations between the Republic of Colombia and the United Mexican States. Both nations are members of the Association of Caribbean States, Community of Latin American and Caribbean States, Latin American Integration Association, Organization of American States, Organization of Ibero-American States, Pacific Alliance and the United Nations.

History
Both nations are host to great indigenous cultures; the Aztecs and Mayas in Mexico and the Muiscas and Incas in Colombia. Colombia and Mexico both share a common history in that they were both colonized by Spain and each nation was the seat of power of one of four Spanish viceroyalties. Soon after gaining independence in the 1820s, the newly independent Mexican Empire and Gran Colombia once bordered each other in what are now the independent nations of Costa Rica and Panama. First contact between both nations took place on 3 October 1823, however, diplomatic relations were officially established on 10 July 1831.

Since the establishment of diplomatic relations, both nations have become increasingly close politically and bilaterally. In 1989, both nations, along with Venezuela formed a trade bloc called the Group of 3 (Grupo de los Tres) which intended to reduce trade tariffs and create a free trade bloc between the three nations within a ten-year time span that took effect in 1995. However, in 2006, former President Hugo Chávez announced that Venezuela would be leaving the bloc due to his estranged relationship with former Mexican President Vicente Fox and former Colombian President Álvaro Uribe. The trade bloc continued without Venezuela until 2007.

Over the past few years, both nations have become increasingly tangled in the war on drugs. Colombia has for many years been known as one of the biggest producers of drugs and for having notorious cartels. Mexico was traditionally a transit country for Colombia drugs to pass through en route to the United States (the largest demand market for drug consumption). However, Mexico has also become increasingly involved in drug production itself and many Mexican drug cartels have increasingly partnered with Colombian cartels in transiting drugs to other markets globally. Both the Colombian and Mexican government have increasingly worked together to combat the cartels and have hired advisers from each other nations to practice successful tactics in each other's nations respectively.

Colombia and Mexico are two of the four founding members of the Pacific Alliance (the others being Chile and Peru). From 2017 to 2018, both nations celebrated a "Dual Year" in order to promote greater rapprochement among both nations, strengthen ties through activities in the areas of culture, education and academic mobility, trade and investment, entrepreneurship and innovation, among others, which were celebrated throughout two years.

In July 2021, Colombian Vice-President and Foreign Minister Marta Lucía Ramírez, paid a visit to Mexico and met with her counterpart Marcelo Ebrard to reaffirm their commitment to strengthening both nations' joint bilateral relations mechanisms. In November 2022, Colombian President Gustavo Petro paid a visit to Mexico and met with Mexican President Andrés Manuel López Obrador. During the visit, Mexico was asked to and accepted the invitation to become a guarantor country in negotiations between the Colombian government and the National Liberation Army (ELN).

High-level visits
Presidential visits from Colombia to Mexico
  

 President Julio César Turbay Ayala (1979)
 President Belisario Betancur (1983, 1985)
 President Virgilio Barco Vargas (1987)
 President César Gaviria (1990, 1991)
 President Ernesto Samper (1994)
 President Andrés Pastrana Arango (1998, 2002)
 President Álvaro Uribe (2004, 2006, 2007, April & November 2008, February 2010) 
 President Juan Manuel Santos (September & November 2010, August & November 2011, 2012, February & December 2014, 2015, 2018)
 President Iván Duque Márquez (2018, 2020)
 President Gustavo Petro  (2022)

Presidential visits from Mexico to Colombia

 President José López Portillo (1976)
 President Miguel de la Madrid Hurtado (1984)
 President Carlos Salinas de Gortari (1989, 1991)
 President Ernesto Zedillo (2000)
 President Vicente Fox (2001)
 President Felipe Calderón (2008, May & August 2009, August & October 2010, 2012)
 President Enrique Peña Nieto (2013, 2014, September and October 2016, 2017, 2018)

Bilateral agreements

Both nations have signed several bilateral agreements such as a Free Trade Agreement; Agreement of Cooperation in Matter of
Legal assistance; Extradition Treaty; Arbitration Treaty; Air Transportation Agreement; Agreement for Cultural and Educational Exchanges; Agreement in Scientific and Technical Cooperation; Agreement of Cooperation in the Fight against Illicit Trafficking
Narcotic Drugs and Psychotropic Substances; Agreement for the Exchange of Non-Judicialized Information; Agreement for Mutual Recognition of Certificates of Studies, Titles and Academic Degrees of Higher Education; Tourist Cooperation Agreement; Agreement to Avoid Double Taxation and to Prevent Tax Evasion in Relation to Taxes on Income and on Equity and an Agreement to Prohibit and Prevent
Theft and/or Theft, Introduction, Extraction and Illicit Trafficking of Cultural Property.

Transportation and Tourism
In 2017, close to half a million Colombian citizens visited Mexico for Tourism. There are direct flights between Colombia and Mexico with the following airlines: Aeroméxico, Avianca and Wingo.

Trade relations
Trade between the two nations has increased dramatically over the past ten years. Since 2001, two-way trade between Colombia and Mexico increased by 382%. In 2018, trade between the two nations totaled US$5 billion. Colombia's main exports to Mexico include: coal, crude oil, instant coffee and automobile parts. Mexico's main exports to Colombia include: flat screen TVs, pure petroleum oil for tank-car, ship-tank or auto-tanks; corrugated rods or bars for reinforcement, for cement or concrete; shampoos; milk powder or pills; tequila and malt beer.

Colombia is Mexico's ninth largest trading partner globally. Between 2000 and 2017, Mexican companies invested over US$4.4 billion. Colombian multinational companies such as Grupo Nutresa and Rappi operate in Mexico. Mexican multinational companies such as América Móvil, Grupo Alsea, Grupo Bimbo, Cemex, Mexichem and Mabe (among others) operate in Colombia.

Resident diplomatic missions
 Colombia has an embassy in Mexico City and consulates in Cancún and in Guadalajara.
 Mexico has an embassy in Bogotá.

See also
 Colombian Mexicans
 Embassy of Colombia, Mexico City

References

External links
 Mexican Ministry of Foreign Affairs on Mexico-Colombia relations (in Spanish)

 
Mexico
Bilateral relations of Mexico